Andrea Razzitti (born 12 March 1989) is an Italian football player who plays as a striker for Lumezzane.

Club career
He made his Serie B debut for Brescia on 20 September 2014 in a game against Ternana.

On 17 January 2018, he was signed by Serie C side Bassano.

On 31 January 2019, he joined AlbinoLeffe.

References

External links
 

1989 births
People from Lovere
Living people
Italian footballers
Association football forwards
U.S. Darfo Boario S.S.D. players
Brescia Calcio players
U.S. Catanzaro 1929 players
Piacenza Calcio 1919 players
U.S. Viterbese 1908 players
L.R. Vicenza players
U.C. AlbinoLeffe players
F.C. Lumezzane V.G.Z. A.S.D. players
Serie B players
Serie C players
Serie D players
Sportspeople from the Province of Bergamo
Footballers from Lombardy